Nepal–Norway relations are bilateral relations between Nepal and Norway. Diplomatic relations were established on 26 January 1973. Norway established an embassy in Kathmandu in 2000. Nepal has a non resident ambassador in Copenhagen.

State visits
In 2008, Norwegian Prime Minister Jens Stoltenberg and Minister of the Environment and International Development Erik Solheim visited Nepal.

In 2009, the Nepalese Prime Minister Prachanda visited Norway.

Norwegian aid
Norway's aid to Nepal was around 32 million USD in 2017. Norwegian aid prioritizes education, good governance and energy.

Embassy bombing
In May 2008, a small bomb exploded outside the Norwegian embassy in Kathmandu. No one was injured.

References

External links
Norwegian Embassy in Nepal

 
Nepal
Norway